Thomas Vincent Darden (born August 28, 1950) is a former American football safety and punt returner who played for the Cleveland Browns of the National Football League (NFL). In nine NFL seasons, he was a three-time All-Pro free safety.  He earned a Pro Bowl selection in 1978. He holds most Cleveland Browns franchise interception records.  He was an All-American defensive back for the Michigan Wolverines football team and made one of the more memorable interceptions in college football history.  After retiring from football, Darden pursued careers as a sports agent, security provider and business consultant.

Early life
Darden was born in Sandusky, Ohio. He graduated from Sandusky High School.

College football
After graduating, he was recruited by six Big Ten Conference football programs in 1968. He played at the University of Michigan from 1969 to 1971 and had 218 tackles and 11 interceptions. He was an All American in 1971, and he was also named All-Big Ten in 1970.   He played on Big Ten champions in both 1969 and 1971. Thom fit in well at Michigan becoming one of Coach Bo Schembechler's prized pupils and earning a reference in his 2006 book Bo Schembechler.  Darden still ranks among leaders at Michigan for Punt Returns and Punt Return Yardage.  Darden played all defensive back positions at Michigan.  In college, Darden was a housemate of Reggie McKenzie, Glenn Doughty, Billy Taylor and Mike Taylor in a notable house known as the Den of the Mellow Men.

ESPN chose Darden's November 21, 1971 interception against Ohio State as one of the 100 Plays, performances and moments that define college football.  The play was a very controversial call late in the 10–7 game and Ohio State coach Woody Hayes stormed the field to rant at the referee Jerry Markbreit about the referee's call that Hayes thought should have been ruled pass interference.  By the end of Hayes' tirade, he had broken a yard marker, shredded a first-down indicator and earned two 15-yard unsportsmanlike penalties.  The scene was replayed over and over on national television broadcasts.  That was Darden's second interception in that game.  ESPN also chose Darden as a member of the All-Time University of Michigan Football team.

Pro football
Darden was drafted in the first round (18th overall) in the 1972 NFL Draft by the Cleveland Browns. Darden started at strong safety in his rookie season of 1972 and played the remainder of his career at free safety until he retired after his tenth and final season, where he only started 10 games.  Autry Beamon and Lawrence Johnson filled in for the injured Darden in his final season (1981).  Clinton Burrell, who won a starting cornerback position in 1980, only played 2 games in 1981.  Rookie Hanford Dixon started at cornerback in place of the injured Burrell.  After Darden's retirement, the Browns moved Clinton Burrell to strong safety and Clarence Scott to free safety.  Darden was selected as an All-Pro safety in 1976, 1978, and 1979, and went to the Pro Bowl in 1978. Over the course of his career he handled 45 punt returns for 285 return yards. Darden holds Cleveland Browns franchise records with 45 career interceptions, 10 single-season interceptions and 820 interception return yards. Two of Darden's Browns teams went to the playoffs. His rookie year, the 10–4 1972 Browns went to the 1972-73 NFL playoffs under head coach Nick Skorich, but lost in the first round to the Miami Dolphins 20–14. The 11–5 1980 Browns went to the 1980-81 NFL playoffs under head coach Sam Rutigliano, but lost in the first round to the Oakland Raiders 14–12.

Darden was ranked 47th on the Cleveland Browns top 100 players list.

Post football 
Darden has served as a professional sports agent and represented Tony Boles.  In 1990, he invested $25,000 in Boles by hosting him in Cleveland, Ohio and working him out with athletic trainers. At the time he was Cleveland-based sports agent. During Darden's career as an agent he represented an assortment of NFL and National Basketball Association players and prospects including Felix Wright and Chris Calloway.  He was a supporter of Maurice Clarett's attempt to challenge the NFL Draft's eligibility rules. In 1998, when the NFL reissued a franchise in Cleveland, Darden was part of one of the six bidding groups.  In 1999, he owned a security company in Cedar Rapids, Iowa. As of 2006, Darden was a business consultant living in Cedar Rapids.

Notes

External links 
 Darden Michigan
 databasefootball.com

1950 births
African-American players of American football
American Conference Pro Bowl players
American football cornerbacks
American football return specialists
American football safeties
Cleveland Browns players
Living people
Michigan Wolverines football players
Sportspeople from Sandusky, Ohio
Players of American football from Ohio
University of Michigan alumni
21st-century African-American people
20th-century African-American sportspeople